Grattan Institute is an Australian public policy think tank, established in 2008.  The Melbourne-based institute is non-aligned, defining itself as contributing "to public policy in Australia as a liberal democracy in a globalised economy." It is partly funded by a $34 million endowment, with major contributions from the Federal Government, the Government of Victoria, the University of Melbourne and BHP.

Grattan Institute currently focuses on six key policy areas: Budgets and Government, Transport and Cities, Energy and Climate Change, Health and Aged Care, Education, and Economic Policy. These programs were chosen with the belief that research into these areas, in line with principles of evidence-based policy could make a demonstrable difference to Australia’s public policy. Grattan Institute also makes provision for experts in other fields to work under its umbrella.

History

Grattan Institute began with pressure from senior figures in the Victorian Public Service, academic institutions, and broader business and non-government leaders, who believed that Australian political life lacked a heavyweight independent think tank. Through the course of 2005 this idea was fleshed out by several people in the Victorian Department of Premier and Cabinet, including discussions with a number of Australia’s corporate leaders. At the end of 2005 the Victorian Premier, Steve Bracks, met with the Federal Treasurer Peter Costello to define the theme for the think tank: Australia as a liberal democracy in a globalised economy. The phrase has since been enshrined in the Constitution of Grattan Institute.

Links between the University of Melbourne, Victorian Government and corporate Australia, along with a supportive report from McKinsey & Company, were the basis for then Victorian Premier Bracks and Treasurer John Brumby in early 2007 to promise significant Victorian Government funding for the idea. Melbourne University was also asked to assist.

In April 2008, Commonwealth and Victorian Governments announced matching funding, along with support in kind from the University of Melbourne. Commitments followed soon after from BHP and National Australia Bank. Grattan receives money from its endowment supporters and affiliates, which include The Myer Foundation, National Australia Bank, Susan McKinnon Foundation, Medibank Private, Google, Maddocks, PricewaterhouseCoopers, McKinsey & Company, The Scanlon Foundation, Wesfarmers, Ashurst, Corrs Chambers Westgarth, Deloitte, General Electric, ANZ, Jemena, Urbis, Westpac and Woodside Petroleum. The Higher Education Program was established with funding from the Myer Foundation.

Grattan Institute was incorporated in November 2008, and its founding Chief Executive, John Daley, commenced in January 2009.

Executive

 CEO - Danielle Wood

Program Heads
 Health and Aged Care - Stephen Duckett
 Energy and Climate Change - Tony Wood
 Education - Jordana Hunter
 Transport - Marion Terrill
 Budgets and Government - Danielle Wood
 Economic Policy - Brendan Coates

Board of directors
Board members (as of October 2022) were:
 Mr Lindsay Maxsted (Chair)
 Ms Carol Austin
 Ms Caroline Cox
 Dr Andrew Cuthbertson AO
 Ms Geraldine Doogue AO
 Ms Kathryn Fagg AO
 Mr Ian Marshman AM
 Prof Duncan Maskell

 Ms Jillian Segal AO
 Dr Ian Watt AC

References

External links
 Grattan Institute website 
 A list of Grattan's reports to date

Think tanks based in Australia
Organisations based in Melbourne
2008 establishments in Australia